Frostop is the name of an American root beer brand and chain of fast food drive-in restaurants. The restaurants are known for their rotating oversized root beer mugs used as outdoor signage.

History
The first Frostop root beer stand was opened in 1926 in Springfield, Ohio by L.S. Harvey. A chain of franchise locations was established, with the biggest growth following World War II. The Frostop drive-ins reached their peak in 1958 with locations concentrated mostly in the American midwest and deep south, but found from New York and Florida to California and Washington state.

Today
Frostop brand products—Root Beer, Sarsaparilla, Red Birch Beer, Orange Cream, Black Cherry,  and a Vanilla Caramel Cream soda—are still available in supermarkets and convenience stores in Arkansas, California, Colorado, Illinois, Iowa, Idaho, Indiana, Louisiana, Michigan, Minnesota, Mississippi, Missouri, Nebraska, Nevada, Ohio, Oregon, Tennessee, Utah, Washington, West Virginia and Wisconsin. Although not as numerous as they were in the 1950s and 1960s, Frostop drive-in franchises can still be found scattered across America.

References

External links 

The LaPlace Frostop Est. 1958 Home of the Lot-O-Burger & Frosty Mug Root Beer
The LaPlace Frostop blog on all things Frostop
One of the remaining drive-in restaurants

Root beer
Fast-food chains of the United States
Fast-food franchises
1926 establishments in Ohio
Root beer stands
Restaurants established in 1926